The Cosmopolitan Club of Philadelphia is a private social club in Philadelphia. It was founded in June 1928 by a group of women from Philadelphia and its surroundings. In January 1930, the members had purchased the lot at 1616 Latimer Street, and oversaw the construction of an Art Deco building.

The members of the Cosmopolitan Club of Philadelphia are all women, and they  represent a wide array of ages, races, cultures, interests, skills, professions and affiliations.

They work and volunteer in the community. Thirty-eight of the Club's past and present members have been named Distinguished Daughters of Pennsylvania.

See also
 Colonial Dames of Pennsylvania in Philadelphia

External links 
 Cosmopolitan Club (official site)
 
 Print Center
The Pennsylvania Headquarters of the Colonial Dames of America

References

Clubs and societies in the United States
Organizations established in 1928
Women's clubs in the United States
History of women in Pennsylvania
Organizations based in Philadelphia